, also known as WTV, is a Japanese commercial terrestrial television station, founded in 1973 and headquartered in Wakayama, Japan. It is a member of the Japanese Association of Independent Television Stations (JAITS). It is the only commercial television station whose headquarter is located in Wakayama Prefecture. The callsign of WTV is JOOM-DTV.

In 2016, WTV's news studio won the Good Design Award.

Offices
The head office - 151 Sakaedani, Wakayama, Wakayama Prefecture
Tanabe office - 3353-9 Shinjocho, Tanabe, Wakayama Prefecture
Tokyo office - Posco Tokyo Building (3th floor)，5-chōme-11-14 Ginza, Chuo City, Tokyo
Osaka office - Dojima Grand bldg (6th floor), 1 Chome-5-17 Dojima,  Kita-ku, Osaka

History
June 7, 1973 - Wakayama Telecasting Corporation was founded. 
April 1, 1974 - WTV starts to broadcast.
October 1, 2006 - WTV starts digital TV broadcasting.
July 24, 2011 - WTV ends analog TV broadcasting

References

External links

  - 
 

Independent television stations in Japan
Television channels and stations established in 1973
Japanese companies established in 1973